Cyphosperma tanga is a species of flowering plant in the family Arecaceae. It is found only in Fiji. Cutting by the Forestry Department resulted in the serious depletion of one subpopulation in 1970 and also continues to affect another more recently discovered subpopulation. Seed crops of reasonable size appear to be extremely infrequent and it is threatened by habitat loss.

Description
Cyphosperma tanga is a moderately stout, small understorey palm that grows up to 5 m in height, with a trunk to 15 cm in diameter. It is also known as Taqwa. The trunk is chocolate brown in colour. A single palm tree has about 12 3 m long, undivided fronds that are held rather erect. There is no crown shaft. Old leaves often persist around the trunk giving the tree a rather tattered appearance. The green inflorescence is long and sparse, growing up to 1.5 m in length and branched to two orders. It emerges from between the leaves, and is initially erect before becoming pendulous. The fruit are oblong ellipsoidal. They turn yellowish brown when mature and grow up to 1.4 cm in length.

Ecology
Taqwa grows as an understorey palm on rocky volcanic soils. The palm trees are sparsely distributed on steep slopes in montane rainforest at an altitude of 600-900m on the north western slopes of Mt. Tomanivi. This area receives very high rainfall of over 5,000 mm annually with little seasonality.

References

tanga
Endemic flora of Fiji
Critically endangered plants
Taxonomy articles created by Polbot